Rolf Semb-Thorstvedt (3 April 1898 – 15 October 1972) was a Norwegian football player for the club SK Frigg. He was born in Kristiania. He played with the Norwegian national team at the Antwerp Olympics in 1920, where the Norwegian team reached the quarter finals. He was capped two times for Norway.

Semb-Thorstvedt won the Norwegian Cup with Frigg in 1921, and he scored one goal in the final against Odd. He also played on the Frigg-team that lost the Norwegian Cup finals in 1919 and 1920. He died in Oslo in 1972.

References

External links

1898 births
1972 deaths
Footballers from Oslo
Norwegian footballers
Norway international footballers
Footballers at the 1920 Summer Olympics
Olympic footballers of Norway
Association football forwards
Frigg Oslo FK players